Cerium(III) methanesulfonate is a white salt, usually found as the dihydrate with the formula Ce(CH3SO3)3·2H2O that precipitates from the neutralisation of cerium(III) carbonate with methanesulfonic acid, as first reported by L.B. Zinner in 1979. The crystals have a monoclinic polymeric structure were each methanesulfonate ion forms bonds with two cerium atoms, which present a coordination number of 8. The anhydrous salt is formed by water loss at 120 °C. Similar methanesulfonates can be prepared with other lanthanides. Cerium(III) methanesulfonate in solution is used as a precursor of electrogenerated cerium(IV), which is a strong oxidant and whose salts can be used in organic synthesis. The same principle of Ce(IV) electrogeneration is the fundamental reaction in the positive half-cell of the zinc–cerium battery.

See also 
 Cerium
 Zinc–cerium battery

References 

Cerium(III) compounds
Oxidizing agents
Sulfonates